Panzerabwehrkanone, usually referred to with the acronym Pak, is the German language term for anti-tank gun. Before and during World War II, the German Army produced a series of 13 anti-tank guns which they designated Panzerabwehrkanone, i.e. Pak. In addition they produced one weapon they designated an anti-tank rifle, which is generally considered to actually be an anti-tank gun; and one gun they designated Panzerabwehrwerfer, PAW, the anti-tank launcher.

Description
In military terminology, a gun is a weapon too heavy to be hand held when fired.

Over the six-year course of World War II the armor of the tanks steadily improved, so in order to be effective the size of the projectile had to increase. A larger projectile required a heavier weapon.

All of these guns were meant to be towed. The earlier ones were light weight enough to be moved by hand, over short distances, into, and out of, their firing positions. Some variants were only used on tank destroyers, which are self-propelled,  like the cannons on tanks.

List
After each gun, the year of introduction is given.
2.8 cm sPzB 41 (1941)
3.7 cm Pak 36 (1928)
4.2 cm Pak 41 (1941)
4.7 cm Pak 38(t) (1939) Exclusively mounted on a tank destroyer.
4.7 cm Pak 181(f) (1937)
5 cm Pak 38 (1937)
7.5 cm Pak 97/38 (1941)
7.5 cm Pak 39 (1943) At  this was too heavy to move by hand. As were all later guns.
7.5 cm Pak 40 (1942)
7.5 cm Pak 41 (1942)
7.5 cm Pak 42 Exclusively mounted on the Jagdpanzer IV.
7.62 cm Pak 36(r) (1942) Captured Soviet anti-tank gun, modified to suit the needs of the German Army.
8 cm PAW 600 (1945) High pressure combustion chamber, delivered propellant gas to a light weight barrel.
8.8 cm Pak 43 (1943)
12.8 cm Pak 44 (1944)

See also
 Pak 57, a Swiss anti-tank gun 

World War II anti-tank guns of Germany